Dahlia coccinea is a species of flowering plant in the daisy family Asteraceae. Its common name is red dahlia, although the flowers can be orange or occasionally yellow, as well as the more common red. The species is native to Mexico but has long been cultivated in other countries for its showy flowers.

Uses
Tubers of the plant were used as a food source by the Aztecs, though this use largely died out after the Spanish conquest. The tubers are highly nutritious.

References

coccinea
Flora of Mexico
Taxa named by Antonio José Cavanilles